Irfan Ismail may refer to:

 Irfan Ismail (cricketer, born 1988), Pakistani cricketer
 Irfan Ismail (cricketer, born 1992), Pakistani cricketer
 Irfan Ismail (footballer), Singaporean footballer for Hougang United FC in the Prime League